Resta in ascolto (English: "Keep Listening") is the eighth studio album by Italian singer Laura Pausini, released by Warner Music on 22 October 2004. Escucha is its Latin Grammy Awards and Grammy Award-winning Spanish language equivalent released for the hispanophone market making her the first and only Italian female to receive such award. The album in its two version (Italian and Spanish).

Escucha features "Víveme", theme song of the highly successful Mexican telenovela La madrastra (2005). The song's exposure extended to the United States when Univision acquired the telenovela and began its broadcast of La madrastra in March 2005. In September 2006, following a year of praise and formal recognition—particularly from the National Academy of Recording Arts and Sciences—Warner Music released special edition CD+DVDs of Escucha in Argentina and the United States. The special editions feature previously unreleased bonus tracks presented in music video form. These tracks include "Prendo te" and "De tu amor".

Promoting the album, Pausini embarked on a world tour during the early 6 months of 2005. The tour has yielded a DVD.

Background
The recording is on the subject of a break-up and was written in 2002, during Pausini's separation from her ex-boyfriend and producer Alfredo Cerruti.

The album features the song "Mi abbandono a te" / "Me abandono a ti", co-written by Pausini, Rick Nowels and Madonna. It also includes the ballad "Vivimi" / "Viveme", written by Biagio Antonacci, and the single "Benedetta passione" / "Bendecida pasión", penned by Italian rock-star Vasco Rossi. The album is mainly focused on themes of anger, bitterness, desire for independence and interior peace, but also features a song about the Iraq War, in which Pausini sings about Ali Ismail Abbas, a boy who was severely injured in a nighttime rocket attack near Baghdad in 2003.

Track listing

Resta in ascolto

Escucha

Limited edition DVD

Charts and certifications

Weekly charts

Year-end charts

Certifications and sales

Personnel
Credits adapted from AllMusic.

Production credits

 Giulio Antognini – assistant engineer, mixing assistant
 Emporio Armani – wardrobe
 Antonio Baglio – mastering
 Joe Beckett – project coordinator
 Luca Bignardi – computers, engineer, mixing, programming
 Matteo Bolzoni – assistant engineer, mixing assistant
 Marco Borsatti – engineer
 John Brough – engineer, mixing
 Cesare Chiodo – producer
 Peter Cobbin – string engineer
 Emiliano Fantuzzi – pre-production
 Daniela Federici – photography
 Geoff Foster – string engineer
 Roberta Frau – assistant

 Chris Garcia – engineer
 Gabriele Gigli – assistant engineer, mixing assistant
 Kieron Menzies – engineer
 Rick Nowels – producer
 Cesare Paciotti – wardrobe
 Sergio Pappalettera – artwork
 Gabrielle Parisi – executive producer
 Dado Parisini – producer, programming
 Laura Pausini – producer
 Wayne Rodrigues – computer analysis, programming
 Tara Saremi – project coordinator
 John Temis – engineer, mixing, producer
 Luca Turatti – assistant engineer, mixing assistant
 Celso Valli – producer

Music credits

 Rusty Anderson – electric guitar
 Biagio Antonacci – composer
 J. Badia – adaptation
 Eric Buffat – composer
 Cheope – composer
 Cesare Chiodo – bass, acoustic guitar, keyboards, piano, composer
 Luis Conte – percussions
 Paolo Costa – bass
 Gaetano Curreri – composer
 Emiliano Fantuzzi – electric guitar
 Gabriele Fersini – electric guitar
 Riccardo Galardini – acoustic guitar
 Antonio Galbiati – composer
 Paolo Gianolio – acoustic guitar
 Alfredo Golino – drums
 Saverio Grandi – composer
 Charles Judge – effects, keyboards, strings
 Madonna – composer

 Rick Nowels – keyboards, Spanish guitar
 Dado Parisini – arranger, brass arrangement, director, keyboards, piano
 Laura Pausini – adaptation, composer, vocals
 Carlos Alberto Perez – percussion
 Roberto Rossi – trombone
 Vasco Rossi – composer
 Marco Tamburini – flugelhorn
 John Themis – arranger, bandir, bass, clay drums, conductor, drum programming, effects, string arrangements
 Ian Thomas – drums
 León Tristán – adaptation
 Celso Valli – arranger, conductor, keyboards, piano, string arrangements
 Michele Vanni – acoustic guitar
 Massimo Varini – acoustic guitar, electric guitar
 Vasko Vassiliev – concert master
 Daniel Vuletic – acoustic guitar, composer
 Geoff Westley – conductor, string arrangements
 Gavyn Wright – concert master

References 

2004 albums
Laura Pausini albums
Spanish-language albums
Albums produced by Rick Nowels
Italian-language albums
Latin Grammy Award for Best Female Pop Vocal Album
Warner Records albums
Grammy Award for Best Latin Pop Album